Pandit Birju Maharaj (born Brijmohan Nath Mishra; 4 February 1938 – 16 January 2022) was an Indian dancer, composer, singer, and exponent of the Lucknow "Kalka-Bindadin" Gharana of Kathak dance in India. He was a descendant of the Maharaj  family of Kathak dancers, which includes his two uncles, Shambhu Maharaj and Lachhu Maharaj, and his father and guru, Acchan Maharaj. He also practised Hindustani classical music and was a vocalist. After working along with his uncle, Shambhu Maharaj at Bhartiya Kala Kendra, later the Kathak Kendra, New Delhi, he remained head of the latter, for several years, until his retirement in 1998 when he opened his own dance school, Kalashram, also in Delhi.

Birju Maharaj was a recipient of the Padma Vibhushan, India's second highest civilian honor, in 1986.

Early life
Maharaj was born Brijmohan Nath Mishra, on 4 February 1938 into a Hindu Brahmin family at Handia of Allahabad district. His father was the Kathak exponent, Jagannath Maharaj, popularly known as Acchan Maharaj of Lucknow gharana and the Kalka-Bindadin family in Lucknow. His father served as the court dancer in Raigarh princely state. Maharaj started dancing early at the age of four, and was trained by his uncles, Lachhu Maharaj and Shambhu Maharaj and his father. He started his performances first at his father's concerts before performing solo at the age of seven in West Bengal. His father died when Maharaj was nine.

Career
Maharaj started teaching the dance form at the age of thirteen, at the Sangeet Bharti in New Delhi. He then taught at the Bharatiya Kala Kendra in Delhi, and at the Kathak Kendra (a unit of the Sangeet Natak Akademi) where he was Head of Faculty, and director, retiring in 1998 after which he opened his own dance school, Kalashram, also in Delhi.

In addition to performing the Kathak dance form, he also brought along knowledge of Hindustani classical music and percussion instruments. He was noted to have been able to sing the thumri while dancing to it, and also playing instruments like the tabla and the dholak. His Kathak performances in addition to mythological stories had contemporary elements including stories from daily life and social issues being communicated by way of the dance. His ginti ki tihaais were noted to have been studied by Kathak students. He collaborated with other artists including the tabla player Zakir Hussain, and singers Rajan and Sajan Mishra. Some of his students included Priti Singh, Saswati Sen, Aditi Mangaldas, and Nisha Mahajan.

Maharaj also choreographed and composed music for many Indian movies. Some of the performances that he choreographed included for Saswati Sen in Satyajit Ray's Shatranj ke Khiladi (1977), Madhuri Dixit in Dil To Pagal Hai (1997), Devdas (2002) and Dedh Ishqiya (2014), Kamal Haasan in Vishwaroopam (2012), Deepika Padukone in Bajirao Mastani (2015) and Alia Bhatt in Kalank (2019). His choreography for Kamal Hassan in Vishwaroopam won him the National Film Award for Best Choreography in 2012, while his choreography for Deepika Padukone in Bajirao Mastani won him a Filmfare Award for Best Choreography in 2016.

Maharaj was one of the youngest artists to receive the Sangeet Natak Akademi Award, when he received the award at the age of 28. He also received the Padma Vibhushan, India's second highest civilian award, in 1986.

Personal life
Maharaj was married and had five children (2 sons and 3 daughters). In later life, Maharaj had kidney disease and diabetes, and received dialysis. He died from a heart attack at his residence in Delhi, on 16 January 2022, less than a month before his 84th birthday.

Controversy 
After his death, several Kathak performers accused Maharaj of sexual abuse. Some of the accusers were minors at the time of the alleged abuse.

Awards and honours
 1964 - Sangeet Natak Akademi Award
 1986 - Padma Vibhushan
 1986 - Nritya Choodamani Award by Sri Krishna Gana Sabha
 1987 - Kalidas Samman
 2002 - Lata Mangeshkar Puraskar
 Honorary doctorate from Indira Kala Sangeet Vishwavidyalaya
 Honorary doctorate from Banaras Hindu University
 Sangam Kala Award
 Bharat Muni Sammaan
 Andhra Ratna
 Nritya Vilas Award
 Adharshila Shikhar Samman
 Soviet Land Nehru Award
 National Nritya Shiromani Award
 Rajiv Gandhi National Sadbhavana Award

Film 

 2012 - National Film Award for Best Choreography for Unnai Kaanaathu (Vishwaroopam)
 2016 - Filmfare Award for Best Choreography for Mohe Rang Do Laal (Bajirao Mastani)

See also
 List of Kathak dancers
 Māni Mādhava Chākyār

References

External links

 Pandit Birju Maharaj (Official Website)
 

1938 births
2022 deaths
20th-century Indian dancers
20th-century Indian educators
Recipients of the Padma Vibhushan in arts
Kathak exponents
Recipients of the Sangeet Natak Akademi Award
Recipients of the Sangeet Natak Akademi Fellowship
Indian choreographers
Indian film choreographers
Artists from Lucknow
Teachers of Indian classical dance
Performers of Indian classical dance
Indian classical choreographers
Dancers from Uttar Pradesh
Educators from Uttar Pradesh
Filmfare Awards winners
Best Choreography National Film Award winners
Recipients of Kalidas Samman